Ballydavock is a townland in the civil parish of Drum, County Mayo, Ireland. It lies in the Roman Catholic parish of Drum and barony of Carra.

References

Townlands of County Mayo